In enzymology, a (hydroxyamino)benzene mutase is an enzyme that catalyzes the chemical reaction

(hydroxyamino)benzene  2-aminophenol

Hence, this enzyme has one substrate, (hydroxyamino)benzene, and one product, 2-aminophenol.

This enzyme belongs to the family of isomerases, specifically those intramolecular transferases transferring hydroxy groups.  The systematic name of this enzyme class is (hydroxyamino)benzene hydroxymutase. Other names in common use include HAB mutase, hydroxylaminobenzene hydroxymutase, and hydroxylaminobenzene mutase.  This enzyme participates in naphthalene and anthracene degradation.

References

 
 

EC 5.4.4
Enzymes of unknown structure